"Wiggle Wobble" is an instrumental written by Les Cooper and performed by Cooper & the Soul Rockers.  The single was produced by Bobby and Danny Robinson. It was featured on their 1963 album Wiggle Wobble Dance Party.

Background
The sax player featured on the song was Joe Grier, originally with The Charts.

Chart performance
It reached #12 on the U.S. R&B chart and #22 on the U.S. pop chart in 1962.

Other versions
Don Covay released a version of the song as a single in 1963, but it did not chart.
Dee Dee Sharp released a version of the song on her 1963 album All the Hits (Volume II).
The Surfaris released a version of the song on their 1963 album Wipe Out.
King Curtis released a version of the song on his 1964 album Soul Serenade.
Sandy Nelson released a version of the song on his 1995 compilation album Rock 'N' Roll Drum Beat.

References

1962 songs
1962 debut singles
1963 singles
Dee Dee Sharp songs
The Surfaris songs
Sandy Nelson songs
1960s instrumentals